Pogroms in the Russian Empire were large-scale, targeted, and repeated anti-Jewish rioting that began in the 19th century. Pogroms began to occur after Imperial Russia, which previously had very few Jews, acquired territories with large Jewish populations from the Polish–Lithuanian Commonwealth and the Ottoman Empire from 1772 to 1815. These territories were designated "the Pale of Settlement" by the Imperial Russian government, within which Jews were reluctantly permitted to live, and it was within them where the pogroms largely took place. Jews were forbidden from moving to other parts of European Russia (including Finland), unless they converted from Judaism or obtained a university diploma or first guild merchant status. Migration to the Caucasus, Siberia, the Far East or Central Asia was not restricted.

1821
The 1821 Odessa pogroms are sometimes considered the first pogroms. After the execution of the Greek Orthodox patriarch, Gregory V, in Constantinople, 14 Jews were killed in response. The initiators of the 1821 pogroms were the local Greeks, who used to have a substantial diaspora in the port cities of what was known as Novorossiya.

1881–1884

The use of the term "pogrom" became common in the English language after a large-scale wave of anti-Jewish riots swept through south-western Imperial Russia (present-day Ukraine and Poland) from 1881 to 1884; when more than 200 anti-Jewish events occurred in the Russian Empire, the most notable of them were pogroms which occurred in Kiev, Warsaw and Odessa.

The event which triggered the pogroms was the assassination of Tsar Alexander II on 13 March [1 March, Old Style], 1881, for which some blamed "agents of foreign influence," implying that Jews committed it. One of the conspirators was of Jewish origins, and the importance of her role in the assassination was greatly exaggerated during the pogroms that followed. Another conspirator was baselessly rumored to be Jewish. The extent to which the Russian press was responsible for encouraging perceptions of the assassination as a Jewish act has been disputed.

Local economic conditions (such as ancestral debts owed to Jewish moneylenders) are thought to have contributed significantly to the rioting, especially with regard to the participation of the business competitors of local Jews and the participation of railroad workers. Russia's industrialization caused Russians to be moving into and out of major cities. People trying to escape the big cities carried their antisemitic values with them, spread the ideas throughout Russia, and caused more pogroms in different regions of Russia. That has been argued to have been actually more important than rumors of Jewish responsibility for the death of the Tsar. Those rumors, however, were clearly of some importance, if only as a trigger, and they drew upon a small kernel of truth: one of the close associates of the assassins, Hesya Helfman, was born into a Jewish home. The fact that the other assassins were all atheists and that the wider Jewish community had nothing to do with the assassination had little impact on the spread of such antisemitic rumors, and the assassination inspired retaliatory attacks on Jewish communities. During these pogroms, thousands of Jewish homes were destroyed; many families were reduced to poverty and large numbers of men, women and children were injured in 166 towns in the south-western provinces of the Empire, such as Ukraine.

There also was a large pogrom on the night of 15–16 April 1881 (the day of Eastern Orthodox Easter) in the city of Yelizavetgrad (now Kropyvnytskyi). On 17 April, the Army units were dispatched and were forced to use firearms to extinguish the riot. However, that only incited the whole situation in the region and a week later series of pogroms rolled through parts of the Kherson Governorate.

On 26 April 1881, an even bigger disorder engulfed the city of Kiev. The Kiev pogrom of 1881 is considered the worst one that took place in 1881. The pogroms of 1881 did not stop then. They continued on through the summer, spreading across a big territory of modern-day Ukraine: (Podolia Governorate, Volyn Governorate, Chernigov Governorate, Yekaterinoslav Governorate, and others). During these pogroms the first local Jewish self-defense organizations started to form—the most prominent one in Odessa, which was organized by the Jewish students of the Novorossiysk University.

For decades after the 1881 pogroms, many government officials held the antisemitic belief that Jews in villages were more dangerous than Jews who lived in towns. The Minister of the Interior Nikolay Pavlovich Ignatyev rejected the theory that pogroms were caused by revolutionary socialists, and instead he adopted the idea that they were a protest by the rural population against Jewish exploitation. With this idea in mind, he promulgated the notion that pogroms had spread from villages to towns. Historians today recognize that although rural peasantry did largely participate in the pogrom violence, pogroms began in the towns and spread to the villages.

The new Tsar Alexander III initially blamed revolutionaries and the Jews themselves for the riots and in May 1882 issued the May Laws, a series of harsh restrictions on Jews.

The pogroms continued for more than three years and were thought to have benefited from at least the tacit support of the authorities, although there were also attempts by the Russian government to end the rioting.

The pogroms and the official reaction to them led many Russian Jews to reassess their perceptions of their status within the Russian Empire, and so led to significant Jewish emigration, mostly to the United States.

These pogroms were referred to among Jews as the "Storms in the South." Changed perceptions among Russian Jews also indirectly gave a significant boost to the early Zionist movement.

Casualties
At least 40 Jews were killed during pogroms between April to December 1881. An additional 225 Jewish women reported being raped; Of these, 17 were reportedly killed while being raped.

British reaction
The leaders of the Jewish community in London were slow to speak out. It was only after Louisa Goldsmid's support following leadership from an anonymous writer named "Juriscontalus" and the editor of The Jewish Chronicle that action was taken in 1881. Public meetings were held across the country and Jewish and Christian leaders in Britain spoke out against the atrocities.

1903–1906

A much bloodier wave of pogroms broke out from 1903 to 1906, leaving an estimated 2,000 Jews dead and many more wounded, as the Jews took to arms to defend their families and property from the attackers. The 1905 pogrom against Jews in Odessa was the most serious pogrom of the period, with reports of approximately 400 Jews killed.

The New York Times described the First Kishinev pogrom of Easter, 1903:

The anti-Jewish riots in Kishinev, Bessarabia [modern Moldova], are worse than the censor will permit to publish. There was a well laid-out plan for the general massacre of Jews on the day following the Orthodox Easter. The mob was led by priests, and the general cry, "Kill the Jews", was taken up all over the city. The Jews were taken wholly unaware and were slaughtered like sheep. The dead number 120 [Note: the actual number of dead was 47–48] and the injured about 500. The scenes of horror attending this massacre are beyond description. Babies were literally torn to pieces by the frenzied and bloodthirsty mob. The local police made no attempt to check the reign of terror. At sunset the streets were piled with corpses and wounded. Those who could make their escape fled in terror, and the city is now practically deserted of Jews.

This series of pogroms affected 64 towns (including Odessa, Yekaterinoslav, Kiev, Kishinev, Simferopol, Romny, Kremenchug, Nikolayev, Chernigov, Kamenets-Podolski, Yelizavetgrad), and 626 small towns (Russian: городок) and villages, mostly in Ukraine and Bessarabia.

Historians such as Edward Radzinsky suggest that many pogroms were incited by authorities and supported by the Tsarist Russian secret police (the Okhrana), even if some happened spontaneously. The perpetrators who were prosecuted usually received clemency by Tsar's decree.

Even outside of these main outbreaks, pogroms remained common; there was an anti-Jewish riot in Odessa in 1905 in which thousands of Jews were killed.

The 1903 Kishinev pogrom, also known as the Kishinev Massacre, in present-day Moldova killed 47–49 persons. It provoked an international outcry after it was publicized by The Times and The New York Times. There was a second, smaller Kishinev pogrom in 1905.

A pogrom on July 20, 1905, in Yekaterinoslav (present-day Dnipro, Ukraine), was stopped by the Jewish self-defense group. One man in the group was killed.

On July 31, 1905, there was the first pogrom outside the Pale of Settlement, in the town of Makariev (near Nizhni Novgorod), where a patriotic procession led by the mayor turned violent.

At a pogrom in Kerch in Crimea on 31 July 1905, the mayor ordered the police to fire at the self-defence group, and two fighters were killed (one of them, P. Kirilenko, was a Ukrainian who joined the Jewish defence group). The pogrom was conducted by the port workers apparently brought in for the purpose.

After the publication of the Tsar's Manifesto of October 17, 1905, pogroms erupted in 660 towns mainly in the present-day Ukraine, in the Southern and Southeastern areas of the Pale of Settlement. In contrast, there were no pogroms in present-day Lithuania. There were also very few incidents in Belarus or Russia proper. There were 24 pogroms outside of the Pale of Settlement, but those were directed at the revolutionaries rather than Jews.

The greatest number of pogroms were registered in the Chernigov gubernia in northern Ukraine. The pogroms there in October 1905 took 800 Jewish lives, the material damages estimated at 70,000,000 rubles. 400 were killed in Odessa, over 150 in Rostov-on-Don, 67 in Yekaterinoslav, 54 in Minsk, 30 in Simferopol—over 40, in Orsha—over 30.

In 1906, the pogroms continued: January — in Gomel, June — in Bialystok (ca. 80 dead), and August — in Siedlce (ca. 30 dead). The Russian secret police and the military personnel organized the massacres.

In many of these incidents the most prominent participants were railway workers, industrial workers, and small shopkeepers and craftsmen, and (if the town was a river port (e.g. Dnipro) or a seaport (e.g. Kerch)), waterfront workmen; peasants joined in mainly to loot.

Response of the United States

The pogroms increasingly angered American opinion.  The well-established German Jews in the United States, although they were not directly affected by the Russian pogroms, were well organized and convinced Washington to support the cause of Jews in Russia. Led by Oscar Straus, Jacob Schiff, Mayer Sulzberger, and Rabbi Stephen Samuel Wise, they organized protest meetings, issued publicity, and met with President Theodore Roosevelt and Secretary of State John Hay. Stuart E. Knee reports that in April, 1903, Roosevelt received 363 addresses, 107 letters and 24 petitions signed by thousands of Christians, public and church leaders alike—all calling on the Tsar to stop the persecution of Jews. Public rallies were held in scores of cities, topped off at Carnegie Hall in New York in May. The Tsar retreated a bit and fired one local official after the Kishinev pogrom, which Roosevelt had explicitly denounced. But Roosevelt was mediating the war between Russia and Japan at the time and could not publicly take sides. Therefore, Secretary Hay took the initiative in Washington. Finally, Roosevelt forwarded a petition to the Tsar, who rejected it claiming that the Jews themselves were at fault.  Roosevelt won Jewish support in his 1904 landslide reelection. The pogroms continued, as hundreds of thousands of Jews fled Russia, most heading for London or New York. With American public opinion turning against Russia, Congress officially denounced its policies in 1906. Roosevelt kept a low profile, as did his new Secretary of State Elihu Root. However, in late 1906 Roosevelt did appoint the first Jew to the cabinet, naming Oscar Straus as his Secretary of Commerce and Labor.

Organization
The pogroms are generally thought to have been organized or at least condoned by the authorities. However, that view was challenged by Hans Rogger, I. Michael Aronson and John Klier, who were unable to find such sanction to be documented in the state archives.

However, the antisemitic policy that was carried out from 1881 to 1917 made them possible. Official persecution and harassment of Jews influenced numerous antisemites to presume that their violence was legitimate. That sentiment was reinforced by the active participation of a few major and many minor officials in fomenting attacks and by the reluctance of the government to stop the pogroms and to punish those responsible for them.

Influence
The pogroms of the 1880s caused a worldwide outcry and, along with harsh laws, propelled mass Jewish emigration from Russia. Among the passed antisemitic laws were the 1882 May Laws, which prohibited Jews from moving into villages,  allegedly in an attempt to address the cause of the pogroms (when, in fact, the pogroms were caused by an entirely different reason). The majority of the Russian High Commission for the Review of Jewish Legislation (1883–1888) actually noted the fact that almost all of the pogroms had begun in the towns and attempted to abolish the laws. However, the minority of the High Commission ignored the facts and backed the laws. Two million Jews fled the Russian Empire between 1880 and 1920, with many going to the United Kingdom and United States. In response, the United Kingdom introduced the Aliens Act 1905, which introduced immigration controls for the first time, a main objective being to reduce the influx of Eastern European Jews.

In reaction to the pogroms and other oppressions of the Tsarist period, Jews increasingly became politically active. Jewish participation in The General Jewish Labor Bund, colloquially known as the Bund, and in the Bolshevik movements, was directly influenced by the pogroms. Similarly, the organization of Jewish self-defense leagues, which stopped the pogromists in certain areas during the second Kishinev pogrom, such as Hovevei Zion, led to a strong embrace of Zionism, especially by Russian Jews.

Cultural references
In 1903, Hebrew poet Hayyim Nahman Bialik wrote the poem In the City of Slaughter in response to the Kishinev pogrom.

Elie Wiesel's The Trial of God depicts Jews fleeing a pogrom and setting up a fictitious "trial of God" for His negligence in not assisting them against the bloodthirsty mobs. In the end, it turns out that the mysterious stranger who has argued as God's advocate is none other than Lucifer. The experience of a Russian Jew is also depicted in Elie Wiesel's The Testament.

A pogrom is one of the central events in the musical play Fiddler on the Roof, which is adapted from Russian author Sholem Aleichem's Tevye the Dairyman stories. Aleichem writes about the pogroms in a story called "Lekh-Lekho". The famous Broadway musical and film Fiddler on the Roof showed the cruelty of the Russian pogroms on the Jews in the fictional Anatevka in the early 20th century.

In the adult animated musical drama film American Pop, set during Imperial Russia during the late 1890s, a rabbi's wife and her young son Zalmie escape to America while the rabbi is killed by the Cossacks.

In the animated film An American Tail, set during and after the 1880s pogroms, Fievel and his family's village is destroyed by a pogrom. (Fievel and his family are mice, and their Cossack attackers are cats.)

The novel The Sacrifice by Adele Wiseman also deals with a family that is displaced after a pogrom in their home country and who emigrate to Canada after losing two sons to the riot and barely surviving themselves. The loss and murder of the sons haunts the entire story.

Mark Twain gives graphic descriptions of the Russian pogroms in Reflections on Religion, Part 3, published in 1906.

Joseph Joffo describes the early history of his mother, a Jew in the Russia of Tsar Nicholas II, in the biographical 'Anna and her Orchestra'. He describes the raids by Cossacks on Jewish quarters and the eventual retribution inflicted by Anna's father and brothers on the Cossacks who murdered and burnt homes at the behest of the tsar.

In Bernard Malamud's novel The Fixer, set in Tsarist Russia around 1911, a Russian-Jewish handyman, Yakov Bog, is wrongly imprisoned for a most unlikely crime.  It was later made into a film directed by John Frankenheimer with a screenplay by Dalton Trumbo.

Isaac Babel recounts a pogrom he experienced as a child in Mykolaiv, ca. 1905, in The Story of My Dovecote. He describes another pogrom against travelers on a train in early 1918 in the short story "The Way".

See also
 Martyrdom in Judaism
 Religious antisemitism
 Antisemitism in Christianity
 Christianity and Judaism
 Antisemitism in the Russian Empire
 Relations between Eastern Orthodoxy and Judaism
 Antisemitism in the Soviet Union
 Antisemitism in Russia
 British responses to the anti-Jewish pogroms in the Russian Empire
 Emancipation of the Jews in England#Pogroms in Russia
 History of the Jews in Russia and the Soviet Union
 Jewish emancipation
 Pogroms of the Russian Civil War

References

Further reading
 Arnold, Richard. Russian Nationalism and Ethnic Violence: Symbolic violence, lynching, pogrom, and massacre (Routledge, 2016).
 Aronson, I. Michael. Troubled waters: Origins of the 1881 anti-Jewish pogroms in Russia (University of Pittsburgh Press, 1990).
 Gerasimov, Ilya V. "Anti-Jewish Violence. Rethinking the Pogrom in East European History." Ab Imperio 2012.3 (2012): 396–412. online
 Goldstein, Yossi. "The impact of Russian terrorism in Kishinev on the Zionist movement and the Jewish intelligentsia." Terrorism and Political Violence 25.4 (2013): 587–596.
 Grosfeld, Irena, Seyhun Orcan Sakalli, and Ekaterina Zhuravskaya. "Middleman minorities and ethnic violence: anti-Jewish pogroms in the Russian empire." Review of Economic Studies 87.1 (2020): 289–342. online
 Humphrey, Caroline. "Odessa: Pogroms in a cosmopolitan city." in Post-Cosmopolitan Cities: Explorations of Urban Coexistence (2012): 17–64.
 Judge, Edward H. Easter in Kishinev: anatomy of a pogrom (NYU Press, 1995).
 Klier, John Doyle. Russians, Jews, and the Pogroms of 1881–1882 (2014).
 Penkower, Monty Noam. "The Kishinev pogrom of 1903: A turning point in Jewish history." Modern Judaism 24.3 (2004): 187–225. online
 Schoenberg, Philip Ernest. "The American Reaction to the Kishinev Pogrom of 1903." American Jewish Historical Quarterly 63.3 (1974): 262–283. online
 Staliūnas, Darius. "Anti-Jewish disturbances in the north-western provinces in the early 1880s." East European Jewish Affairs 34.2 (2004): 119–138.
 Weinberg, Robert. "Workers, pogroms, and the 1905 revolution in Odessa." Russian Review 46.1 (1987): 53–75. online
 Zhuravskaya, Ekaterina, Irena Grosfeld, and Seyhun Orcan Sakalli. "Middleman Minorities and Ethnic Violence: Anti-Jewish Pogroms in the Russian Empire." (2018). online

Historiography
 Budnitskii, Oleg. "Jews, Pogroms, and the White Movement: A Historiographical Critique." Kritika: Explorations in Russian and Eurasian History 2.4 (2001): 1-23.
 Dekel-Chen, Jonathan, et al., eds. Anti-Jewish violence: rethinking the pogrom in East European history (Indiana UP, 2010).
 Karlip, Joshua M. "Between martyrology and historiography: Elias Tcherikower and the making of a pogrom historian." East European Jewish Affairs 38.3 (2008): 257–280.
 Klier, John Doyle, and Shlomo Lambroza, eds. Pogroms: Anti-Jewish Violence in Modern Russian History (2004).
 Weinberg, Robert. "Visualizing pogroms in Russian history." Jewish History (1998): 71–92. online
 Zipperstein, Steven J. Pogrom: Kishinev and the tilt of history  (Liveright, 2018). online

External links
 Lenin's speech: About Anti-Jewish Pogroms (Text of the speech)
 Jewish history of the Russian Federation (through the Second World War)
 Modern History Sourcebook: The Jewish Chronicle: Outrages Upon Jews in Russia, May 6, 1881
 Jewish Virtual Library page "Pogroms"
 History of pogroms in Odessa
 The Pogrom of 1905 in Odessa: A Case Study
 Kishinev pogrom history

he:הסופות בנגב